The 314th Airlift Wing (314 AW) is a wing of the United States Air Force based at Little Rock Air Force Base in Little Rock, Arkansas. Its mission is to carry out Lockheed C-130 Hercules combat airlift training.

The wing was activated in November 1948 as the 314th Troop Carrier Wing at Smyrna Air Force Base, Tennessee, but traces earlier history to the creation of the 314th Troop Carrier Group in 1942.

Subordinate units
 314th Operations Group
 48th Airlift Squadron (48 AS) - C-130J
 62d Airlift Squadron (62 AS) - C-130J
 714th Training Squadron (714 TRS)

 314th Maintenance Group
 314th Maintenance Squadron
 314th Aircraft Maintenance Squadron
 314th Maintenance Operations Squadron

 314th Mission Support Group
 314th Contracting Squadron
 314th Security Forces Squadron
 314th Services Squadron
 314th Logistics Readiness Squadron
 314th Mission Support Squadron
 314th Communications Squadron
 314th Civil Engineer Squadron

 314th Medical Group
 314th Medical Operations Squadron
 314th Medical Support Squadron

History
 See the 314th Operations Group for related history and lineage

Korean War
The wing was activated in November 1948 as the 314th Troop Carrier Wing at Smyrna Air Force Base, Tennessee.

The wing served in Japan during the Korean War, participating in two major airborne operations, at Sunchon in October 1950 and at Munsan-ni in March 1951. It later transported supplies to Korea and evacuated prisoners of war.

Early Cold War and Vietnam War periods
The wing was transferred without personnel or equipment back to the U.S. in 1954. There it served as a primary troop carrier unit in the eastern U.S., participating in joint airborne training with Army forces, developing assault airlift operations, and performing in aerial demonstrations, exercises, maneuvers, and joint operations. Between January 1966 and May 1971, it operated from Ching Chuan Kang Air Base Taiwan as part of the 315th Air Division to provide passenger and cargo airlift throughout the Far East and combat airlift in Southeast Asia during the Vietnam War period.

Later Cold War period
Again returning to the U.S. in May 1971, the 314th acquired the assets of the inactivated 64th Tactical Airlift Wing and incurred host organization responsibilities of Little Rock Air Force Base, Arkansas. It has since operated C-130 training schools, providing classroom instruction and flying training to all branches of the U.S. military and allied nations and served as a tactical airlift wing involved in worldwide airborne training, airlift, and special operations including deployments in support of the Commander-in-Chief, United States Air Forces in Europe. It also provided joint airborne communications center and command post support for the United States Readiness Command. In October 1983, the wing provided Joint Airborne Communications Center/Command Post equipment in support of the rescue of U.S. nationals in Grenada. During December 1989 and January 1990, it provided airlift support during the intervention in Operation Just Cause in Panama.

Post Cold War period
The 314th conducted airlift control support in addition to airlift of troops and equipment to the Middle East in support of the liberation of Kuwait, August 1990 – March 1991.

From 1991 to present, in addition to its primary mission of aircrew training, the wing conducted numerous disaster relief and humanitarian support missions including airdrop of U.S. Army Troops; humanitarian aid; emergency supplies; and medical evacuations in addition to airlifting passengers and equipment.

Operations
Korean War
Operation Urgent Fury
Operation Just Cause
Operation Desert Shield
Operation Desert Storm

Lineage
 Established as the 314th Troop Carrier Wing, Medium on 4 October 1948
 Activated on 1 November 1948
 Redesignated 314th Troop Carrier Wing on 1 January 1967
 Redesignated 314th Tactical Airlift Wing on 1 August 1967
 Redesignated 314th Airlift Wing on 1 December 1991

Assignments

 Ninth Air Force, 1 November 1948
 Fourteenth Air Force, 1 February 1949
 Tactical Air Command, 1 August 1950
 Eighteenth Air Force, 1 June 1951
 Ninth Air Force, 1 September 1957
 839th Air Division, 8 October 1957 (attached to 315th Air Division after 22 January 1966)
 315th Air Division, 27 January 1966
 327th Air Division, 1 November 1968
 Twelfth Air Force, 31 May 1971
 834th Air Division, 15 March 1972
 Twenty-Second Air Force, 31 December 1974
 Fifteenth Air Force, 1 July 1993
 Eighth Air Force, 1 October 1993
 Nineteenth Air Force, 1 April 1997
 Air Education and Training Command, 12 July 2012
 Nineteenth Air Force, 1 October 2014 – present

Components
 Groups
 34th Tactical Airlift Training Group: 15 September 1978 – 1 December 1991
 309th Troop Carrier Group: (attached 26 June 1949 – 20 February 1951 – Recerve Corollary Unit)
 313th Troop Carrier Group (attached 1 October 1953 – 8 June 1955)
 314th Air Base Group (later 314th Combat Support Group, 314th Support Group, 314th Mission Support Group):  1 November 1948 – 8 October 1957, 1 October 1964 – 1 December 1965, 1 May 1971 – present
 314th Maintenance and Supply Group (later 314th Logistics Group, 314th Maintenance Group): 1 November 1948 – 8 October 1957, 1 December 1991 – present
 314th Medical Group (see 314th Station Medical Group and USAF Hospital, Little Rock)
 314th Station Medical Group (later 314th Medical Group, 314th Tactical Infirmary, 314th Tactical Hospital): 1 November 1948 – 8 October 1957, 1 May 1971 – 1 March 1975
 314th Troop Carrier Group (later 314th Tactical Airlift Group, 314th Operations Group: 1 November 1948 – 8 October 1957, 15 September 1978 – 15 June 1980, 1 December 1991 – present
 Attached to Far East Air Forces, 7 September 1950, FEAF Combat Cargo Command, 10 September 1950, 314th Air Division, 1 December 1950, 315th Air Division, 25 January 1951 – c. 1 November 1952; attached to 483d Troop Carrier Wing, 1 January 1953 – 15 November 1954)
 316th Troop Carrier Group: 4 November 1949 – 14 November 1954
 513th Troop Carrier Group: (attached 8 November 1955 – 8 October 1957)
 516th Troop Carrier Group: (attached 8 May 1955 – 9 July 1956)

 Hospital
 USAF Hospital, Little Rock (later 314th Medical Group); 1 April 1971 – present

Stations
 Smyrna Air Force Base (later Sewart Air Force Base), 1 November 1958 – c. 15 January 1966
 Ching Chuan Kang Air Base, Taiwan, 22 January 1966
 Little Rock Air Force Base, Arkansas, 31 May 1971 – present

Aircraft operated

 Douglas C-47 Skytrain (1948–1953)
 Fairchild C-82 Packet (1948–1951)
 Waco CG-15 (glider) (1949–1951)
 Chase YG-18 (glider) (1949–1951)
 Fairchild C-119 Flying Boxcar (1949–1951)
 Douglas C-54 Skymaster (1949–1951, 1954–1955)
 Curtiss C-46 Commando (1952)
 Curtiss TC-46 Commando (1950)
 Chase YC-122 Avitruc(1950–1954)
 YH-12 (1951)
 Sikorsky H-19 Chickasaw (1952–1955)
 L-5 Sentinel (1952–1953)
 Aeronca L-16 (1952–1953)
 De Havilland Canada L-20 Beaver (1952–1954)
 Piasecki H-21 (1955–1959)
 Fairchild C-123 Provider (1956–1961)
 Lockheed C-130 Hercules (1956 – present)
 Lockheed DC-130 Hercules (1979–1981)
 Learjet C-21 (1999–2011)

Unit emblems

References

Notes

Bibliography

External links
 Little Rock AFB Home Page

Military units and formations in Arkansas
0314
Military units and formations of the United States Air Force in the Vietnam War